Here Comes Winter is the second album by Parker and Lily. It was released on September 24, 2002 via the label, Manifesto Records.

Track listing
"Hello Halo" - 3:24
"My Apartment Complex" - 2:03
"Idle In Idlewild" - 2:10
"You Are My Matinee" - 2:44
"Violet In Violet" - 3:11
"Bridge And Tunnel" - 3:08
"Motel Lights" - 2:53
"In Bonn" - 3:03
"Planes In Clouds" - 2:53
"Snow Day" - 4:34
"Interior: Airport" - 1:32
"Three-Day Life" - 3:12
"Separate Rooms" - 3:04
"For C.L. (Iowa Is Passing By)" - 3:53
"Hey Sau Jin" - 2:11

References

2001 albums
Parker and Lily albums